Saint-Girons is a commune in the Ariège department in southwestern France.

History

Antiquity

Unlike its close neighbour Saint-Lizier, Saint-Girons isn't an ancient city; there was however a lucus on its present territory where some Roman finds were made during the construction of the train station in the beginning of the twentieth century. Modern-days district Le Luc is considered to owe its name to this ancient lucus.

Foundation

The city is named after Saint Girons, a saint from fifth-century Landes who evangelized Novempopulania. In the ninth century some of his relics were supposedly buried in Saint Girons' Church, around which the city later developed.

Climate
Saint-Girons has a moderate but warm oceanic climate, that is quite prone to temporary vast extremes in temperature as a result of its inland position.

Population
Inhabitants of Saint-Girons are called Saint-Gironnais.

Sport
Stage 8 of the 2009 Tour de France finished in Saint-Girons, after travelling 176 km from Andorra la Vella.

Stage 9 of the 2013 Tour de France started here.

References

Communes of Ariège (department)
Subprefectures in France
Ariège communes articles needing translation from French Wikipedia